Harold Banner Steel (9 April 1862 – 29 June 1911) was an English cricketer active from 1883 to 1896 who played for Lancashire and Cambridge University. He was born in Liverpool and died in Burnham-on-Sea. He appeared in 36 first-class matches as a righthanded batsman who bowled right arm medium pace. He scored 1,042 runs with a highest score of 100 and held 20 catches. He took one wicket with a best analysis of one for 15.

Harold Steel was the third of four brothers who played for Lancashire: Douglas, A. G., himself and Ernest. Harold followed Douglas to Uppingham School and, when Douglas left in 1875, Harold was withdrawn from the school because of a typhoid epidemic in the area, caused by a poorly maintained water system. The headmaster, Edward Thring, relocated the whole school to Borth in Wales for over a year until the danger was past. Harold Steel did not return to Uppingham. Instead, he went to Repton where he was in the First XI in 1879 and 1880, making a good reputation as a batsman. Having been at Trinity Hall, Cambridge, for three years, he played sporadically for Lancashire from 1883 to 1896. He preferred good-class club cricket in which he appeared for Liverpool Cricket Club, Quidnuncs and others.

Notes

1862 births
1911 deaths
Lancashire cricketers
Liverpool and District cricketers
People educated at Uppingham School
People educated at Repton School
Alumni of Trinity Hall, Cambridge
Cricketers from Liverpool